Arne Høyer (9 November 1928 – 2 April 2010) was a Danish sprint canoer who won a bronze medal in the K-1 4×500 m relay at the 1960 Summer Olympics, together with Erik Hansen, Helmuth Sørensen and Erling Jessen.

References

Arne Høyer's profile at Sports Reference.com
Arne Høyer's obituary 

1928 births
2010 deaths
Canoeists at the 1960 Summer Olympics
Olympic canoeists of Denmark
Olympic bronze medalists for Denmark
Olympic medalists in canoeing
Danish male canoeists
People from Struer Municipality
Medalists at the 1960 Summer Olympics
Sportspeople from the Central Denmark Region